Ranče is a settlement in the eastern Pohorje Hills in the Municipality of Rače–Fram in northeastern Slovenia. The area is part of the traditional region of Styria and is now included in the Drava Statistical Region.

History
In February 2013, part of the settlement of Ranče was declared autonomous as the settlement of Šestdobe.

References

External links
Ranče at Geopedia

Populated places in the Municipality of Rače-Fram